Tufts Health Plan was a Massachusetts-based non-profit health insurance company under Tufts Associated Health Plans, Inc. with headquarters in Watertown, Massachusetts. It completed a merger with Harvard Pilgrim Health Care on January 1, 2021, making the yet-to-be-named company the second-largest health insurer in Massachusetts. The merger had been announced on August 14, 2019; the combined company will serve 2.4 million members in Massachusetts, Maine, Connecticut, New Hampshire, and Rhode Island.

Tufts Health Plan was founded in 1979 by Morton Madoff., M.D., dean of Tufts University School of Medicine. As of May 2019, the organization  had over 1 million members. The Tufts Health Plan network includes 110 hospitals and 51,000+ health care providers. The health plan offers products for employers, individuals enrolled in Medicare, Medicaid the Massachusetts Health Insurance Exchange, and individuals who are dually eligible for Medicare and Medicaid. Tufts Health Plan is the only insurer in Massachusetts to cover everyone, regardless of age or income.

History 

Morton Madoff, M.D., of Tufts University Medical School, founded Tufts Associated Health Maintenance Organization, Inc. in 1979. The organization started offering plans in 1981, ending its first year with 3,000 members.

In 1994, Tufts Health Plan entered the Medicare market with Secure Horizons and utilized value-based contracts to achieve better health outcomes for members and better control costs.

In 1995, Tufts Health Plan launched its first PPO (preferred provider organization) plans. In 1996 Tufts Health Plan was ranked as a top HMO provider in the United States by Newsweek.

In 2008, Tufts Health Plan created the Tufts Health Plan Foundation so the health plan's assets could help address long-standing health care issues in the local community. The foundation funds approximately $5 million annually in investments and grants to local non-profits.

In 2009, Tufts Health Plan entered the Rhode Island market, offering employer-sponsored plans.

In 2011, Tufts Health Plan acquired Network Health, a Medicaid plan.

In 2015, Tufts Health Plan acquired Integra Partners, a medical equipment and prosthetics management company backed by Peterson Partners.

Also in 2015, Tufts Health Plan entered into a joint venture with Granite Health, a network of five health systems, creating Tufts Health Freedom Plan of New Hampshire.

In 2016, the company transformed core business operations to HealthEdge.

In 2017, Tufts Health Plan signed contracts to form Medicaid (MassHealth) Accountable Care Organization (ACO) partnerships with four provider organizations: Atrius Health, Beth Israel Deaconess Care Organization, Cambridge Health Alliance, and Boston Children's Accountable Care Organization. Also in 2017, Tufts Health Plan entered the Rhode Island Medicaid market.

In February 2018, Tufts Health Plan entered into a joint venture with Hartford HealthCare, creating CarePartners of Connecticut, which offers Medicare Advantage plans to eligible beneficiaries.

On January 26, 2021, Tufts Health Plan announced the completion of their merger with Harvard Pilgrim Health Care.

In July 2021, Tufts Health Plan awarded the Metropolitan Boston Housing Partnership with a grant of $170,000.

References

External links
 Official website
LinkedIn page
Facebook page

Health insurance in the United States
1979 establishments in the United States
Insurance companies of the United States
Financial services companies established in 1979
Health care companies established in 1979
Health care companies of the United States